Stanley Hall, near to Astley Abbotts in Shropshire, England, is a Grade II listed building that first gained its protected status in 1970. It dates probably from the early 17th century. It was for some time the family seat of the Tyrwhitt baronets.

References

External links 

Grade II listed buildings in Shropshire
Country houses in Shropshire
Grade II listed houses